The boys' ice hockey tournament at the 2012 Winter Youth Olympics was held from 13 to 22 January at the Tyrolean Ice Arena in Innsbruck, Austria.

Teams from five national hockey associations competed, in one single preliminary round group.  The tournament consisted of 14 games: 10 in the preliminary round (teams played all other teams); 2 semifinal games; 1 bronze medal game; and 1 gold medal game.

All games were played in three 15-minute periods, as opposed to the traditional 20-minute periods.

Qualification
The top eight teams in the 2011 IIHF World Ranking will choose which tournament (either boys' or girls') they want to compete in. First priority is given to higher ranked nations.

Rosters

Each country is allowed to enter 17 athletes each.

Preliminary round
All times are local (UTC+1).

Playoffs

Semifinals

Bronze medal game

Gold medal game

References

Ice hockey at the 2012 Winter Youth Olympics